Jovica Jevtić (born 1975) is a politician in Serbia. He served in the National Assembly of Serbia from 2014 to 2020 as a member of the Serbian Progressive Party.

Private career
Jevtić is an electrical engineer and works as a plant manager in Kraljevo. Based in neighbouring Raška, he was appointed as acting director of that community's institute for urban planning and construction in 2012.

Political career
Jevtić received the 121st position on the Progressive Party's Aleksandar Vučić — Future We Believe In electoral list in the 2014 parliamentary election and was declared elected when the list won a landslide victory with 158 out of 250 mandates. He again received the 121st position in the 2016 election for the renamed Aleksandar Vučić – Serbia Is Winning list and was re-elected when the list won a second consecutive landslide victory with 131 mandates. Jevtić serves on the parliamentary committee on spatial planning, transport, infrastructure, and telecommunications; is a deputy member of the committee on education, science, technological development, and the information society; and is a member of the parliamentary friendship group with Bosnia and Herzegovina.

References

1975 births
Living people
Members of the National Assembly (Serbia)
People from Raška, Serbia
Serbian Progressive Party politicians